This is a list of roads abbreviated N24.

 N24 road (Belgium)
 N24 road (France)
 N24 road (Ireland)
 N24 road (Luxembourg)
 N24 road (Switzerland)
 Nebraska Highway 24, a state highway in the U.S. state of Nebraska

See also
 List of highways numbered 24